Krišlovce is a village and municipality in Stropkov District in the Prešov Region of north-eastern Slovakia.

History
In historical records the village was first mentioned in 1567.

Geography
The municipality lies at an altitude of 290 metres and covers an area of 4.392 km². It has a population of about 47 people.

References

External links
 
 
https://web.archive.org/web/20070427022352/http://www.statistics.sk/mosmis/eng/run.html 

Villages and municipalities in Stropkov District